Acacia pedina is a tree or shrub belonging to the genus Acacia and the subgenus Phyllodineae native to eastern Australia.

Description
It has glabrous and flexuose branchlets that are covered in a fine white powdery substance. Like most species of Acacia it has phyllodes rather than true leaves. The evergreen adult phyllodes have an oblanceolate to obovate shape and are straight to shallowly recurved. The bluish green to brownish green glabrous phyllodes have a prominent midrib with a weak vein that jois the proximal part of the midvein to the gland. The spherical flower-heads can be slightly ovoid and contain 25 to 40 yellow to golden coloured flowers.

Distribution
It is endemic to New South Wales from around the Bermagui in the north down to near Tahra in the south where it is found on headlands or behind sand dunes growing in sandy or clay loam soils as a part of open Eucalyptus forest communities.

See also
 List of Acacia species

References

pedina
Flora of New South Wales
Plants described in 1999